Elections to the Baseball Hall of Fame for 1966 followed the system introduced for even-number years in 1956. 
The Baseball Writers' Association of America (BBWAA) voted by mail to select from recent major league players with provision for a second, "runoff" election in case of no winner. Ted Williams tallied more than 90% on the first ballot. Meanwhile, the Veterans Committee was meeting annually to consider executives, managers, umpires, and earlier major league players. It selected Casey Stengel. A formal induction ceremony was held in Cooperstown, New York, on July 25, 1966, with Commissioner of Baseball William Eckert presiding. During his acceptance speech, Williams advocated for the inclusion of Negro league baseball players, such as Satchel Paige and Josh Gibson, in the Hall of Fame. Paige was inducted in 1971, and Gibson in 1972.

BBWAA election
The BBWAA was authorized to elect players active in 1946 or later, but not after 1960. All 10-year members of the BBWAA were eligible to vote.

Voters were instructed to cast votes for up to 10 candidates; any candidate receiving votes on at least 75% of the ballots would be honored with induction to the Hall. A total of 49 players received votes; 302 ballots were cast, with 227 votes required for election. A total of 2,210 individual votes were cast, an average of 7.32 per ballot.

Candidates who were eligible for the first time are indicated here with a dagger (†). The one candidate who received at least 75% of the vote and was elected is indicated in bold italics; candidates who have since been elected in subsequent elections are indicated in italics. Al López was later elected as a manager.

Ted Williams was elected with 93.4% of the vote. Williams won the Triple Crown twice and was the last player to hit .400 in a season (.406 in 1941). He famously used his Hall induction speech to advocate for elections of Negro league players.

Tommy Bridges was eligible for the final time.

J. G. Taylor Spink Award 
Charles Dryden (1860–1930) received the J. G. Taylor Spink Award honoring a baseball writer. The award was voted at the December 1965 meeting of the BBWAA, and included in the summer 1966 ceremonies.

References

External links
1966 Election at www.baseballhalloffame.org

Baseball Hall of Fame balloting
Hall of Fame balloting